Lorino (Chukchi: , Ḷ'urèn, lit. found camp; Naukan: Lluughraq) is a rural locality (a selo) in Chukotsky District of Chukotka Autonomous Okrug, Russia. It is located on the boundary of the Chukchi Sea and the Bering Sea. Population:  Municipally, Lorino is subordinated to Chukotsky Municipal District and incorporated as Lorino Rural Settlement.

Geography
Lorino is the largest indigenous village in the whole autonomous okrug and larger even than Lavrentiya, the administrative centre of the district, which is found to the north-west. The village is located on the shores of the Bering Sea, on the Mechigmen spit. it is 40.5 km to the district centre. Near the village are the Lorinski (Kukunyskie) hot springs.

History
The name "Lorino" comes from the Chukchi "льурэн" (lyuren), meaning "found camp". The first mention of Lorino comes from the 18th century, with the modern Chukchi village located on the site of the former Eskimo settlement of Nukak [6]. The main occupations of the inhabitants are sea mammal hunting, reindeer herding and fishing and the village is the base for the municipal agricultural enterprise "Keper". A fox farm was established in the village in 1955 and a processing factory for seafood and meat canning was opened in 2009.

Culture
The area around the village was used as the setting for the film The Chief of Chukotka.

The village has a high school, a daycare center, a boarding school, a cultural center, a food store, a hospital, a post-office, and a breeding farm with more than 300 Arctic foxes. The Lorino Dawns native ensemble under the guidance of N. Ginuntegin is based in the village.

Demographics
The population as of the official 2010 census results was 1267, of whom 628 were male and 639 female. This is a reduction on a 2003 estimate by Red Cross Chukotka as 1,419, of which 1,288 were indigenous peoples.

Transport
The village of Lorino is linked to Lavrentiya by a  unpaved road. There is, however, a small number of roads within the settlement including:

 Улица Гагарина (Ulitsa Gagarina, lit. Gagarin Street)
 Улица Енок (Ulitsa Yenok)
 Улица Ленина (Ulitsa Lenina, lit. Lenin Street)
 Улица Челюскинцев (Ulitsa Chelyuskintsev, lit Chelyuskin Street)
 Улица Чукотская (Ulitsa Chukotskaya, lit. Chukotka Street)

Climate

Gallery

See also
List of inhabited localities in Chukotsky District

References

Notes

Sources

 
 
Strogoff, M, Brochet, P-C and Auzias, D. Petit Futé: Chukotka, "Avant-Garde" Publishing House, 2006.

Rural localities in Chukotka Autonomous Okrug
Chukchi Sea
Road-inaccessible communities of Russia